Kumwambu is an administrative ward in Muhambwe Constituency in Kibondo District of Kigoma Region in Tanzania. 
In 2016 the Tanzania National Bureau of Statistics report there were 6,689 people in the ward.

Villages / neighborhoods 
The ward has 9 hamlets. Prior to 2014 Kumwambu was a village in the Kibondo Mjini ward.

 Kabwigwa
 Kibingo
 Kingoro
 Kumgarika
 Kumkenga
 Kumwambu
 Nakayuki

References

Kibondo District
Wards of Kigoma Region
Constituencies of Tanzania